The Wolverine Formation is a geological formation in central Yukon, Canada. It consists of a lava flow in the Fort Selkirk Volcanic Field of the Northern Cordilleran Volcanic Province that was erupted during the Pleistocene period.

See also
List of volcanoes in Canada
List of Northern Cordilleran volcanoes
Volcanism of Canada
Volcanism of Northern Canada

References

Volcanism of Yukon
Pleistocene volcanism
Cenozoic Yukon
Stratigraphy of Yukon